Bartłomiej Niedziela (born May 7, 1985 in Grójec) is a Polish footballer who plays as a midfielder for Pilica Białobrzegi.

Career

Club
In July 2011, he joined Arka Gdynia on a one-year contract. Following his contract with Gdynia ended in June 2012, he rejoined his former team Flota Świnoujście on a one-year contract.

References

External links
 
 

1985 births
Living people
Polish footballers
Ekstraklasa players
I liga players
III liga players
IV liga players
Motor Lublin players
Górnik Łęczna players
Flota Świnoujście players
Jagiellonia Białystok players
Arka Gdynia players
Chojniczanka Chojnice players
Widzew Łódź players
OKS Stomil Olsztyn players
People from Grójec
Sportspeople from Masovian Voivodeship
Association football midfielders